Teen Mom Australia is an Australian reality television series which is a spin-off of the American franchise Teen Mom. It currently airs on 10 Shake and  MTV. The series was first screened on MTV in July 2019. The second season premiered on MTV and 10 Shake in October 2020. It follows the lives of Australian teenage mums who are trying to make it through motherhood.

Episodes

Series overview

Series 1 (2019)

Series 2 (2020)

References

External links
 
 

2019 Australian television series debuts
2010s Australian reality television series
English-language television shows
MTV reality television series
Teenage pregnancy in television
Reality television spin-offs
Australian television spin-offs
Television series about teenagers
2020s Australian reality television series